Eha Lättemäe (2 September 1922 Mõnnaste – 14 November 2012 Tallinn) was an Estonian poet who also wrote poems in Finnish. In addition, she translated Finnish poetry into Estonian and Estonian poetry into Finnish. Beginning in 1971, she worked as a professional writer.

Awards
In 2008, Lättemäe was awarded with Juhan Liiv Poetry Award for her poem "Kui talveöö on paratamatu..." ('If a Winter Night Is Inevitable').

Collections
Oma sammude varjust (1968)
Uskoon aurinkoon (1969)
Pääsuke päevalind (1971)
Nõnda ma lähen (1973)
Metsamarju. Mõtsamarju(1974)
Poimin marjoja sinisestä metsästä (1975)
Kahel häälel (1981) (with father Lättemäe)
Elulugu (1981)
Iltakävelyllä / Õhtune jalutuskäik (2003)

References

1922 births
2012 deaths
Estonian women poets
20th-century Estonian poets
21st-century Estonian poets
Estonian translators
Recipients of the Order of the White Star, 5th Class
University of Tartu alumni
People from Viljandi Parish